Doctor in Distress is a 1963 British comedy film directed by Ralph Thomas and starring Dirk Bogarde, James Robertson Justice, and Samantha Eggar. It is the fifth of the seven films in the Doctor series. After a one-film absence, it was the final return to the role of Simon Sparrow by Dirk Bogarde, and also the return (although in a different role) of Donald Houston. The film uses some of the characters in Richard Gordon's Doctor novels, but is not based on any of them.

Plot
Simon Sparrow, now a senior doctor at Hampden Cross Hospital, falls in love with Delia, a model and aspiring actress. They eventually move in together, but then she goes to Italy to audition for a film.

Meanwhile, Sir Lancelot Spratt injures his back in a fall. Placed under the care of physiotherapist Iris Marchant, he is initially hostile, but soon succumbs to her charms. He turns to his friend Simon for advice. Simon sends him to a nature cure clinic in a vain attempt to help him lose weight. Spratt has Iris followed, and, when his private investigator turns up at Hampden Cross as a patient, follows her himself (terrorising a nervous train passenger in the process). He proposes to her, but is eventually rejected in favour of another of her patients, retired army Major Tommy French.

Delia returns to England, having somehow acquired an expensive Italian car (a Maserati Sebring) and expensive clothes, though she did not win a part in the film. It is implied that she and Simon get together again.

Main cast

Dirk Bogarde as Dr. Simon Sparrow
James Robertson Justice as Sir Lancelot Spratt
Samantha Eggar as Delia Mallory
Barbara Murray as Iris Marchant
Mylène Demongeot as Sonia and Helga
Donald Houston as Major Tommy French
Jessie Evans as Mrs. Parry
Ann Lynn as Mrs. Whittaker
Leo McKern as Harry
Dennis Price as Dr. Blacker
David Weston as Dr. Stewart
Fenella Fielding as Train Passenger
Jill Adams as Genevieve
Paul Whitsun-Jones as Grimes
Michael Flanders as Bradby
Amanda Barrie as Rona
Reginald Beckwith as Meyer
Bill Kerr as Australian Sailor
Michael Goldie as Physical Training Instructor
Ronnie Stevens as Hotel Manager
Peter Butterworth as Ambulance Driver
Derek Fowlds as Gillibrand
Timothy Bateson as Mr. Holly
Joe Robinson as Sonia's Boyfriend
Ronnie Barker as Man at Railway Station Ticket Counter
John Bluthal as Railway Porter
Marianne Stone as Cafe Waitress 
Harry Landis as man in cafe
Ronald Lacey as man in cafe 
Denise Coffey as Food seller at Railway Station
Jeanette Landis as Rosie
Margaret Boyd as Lady Willoughby
Frank Finlay as Corsetiere
Rodney Cardiff as Student Doctor
Richard Briers as Medical Student (uncredited)
Christopher Beeny as Medical Student (uncredited)
Johnny Briggs as Medical Student (uncredited)
Felix Felton as Farm Patient (uncredited)

Reception
The film was one of the ten most popular movies at the British box office in 1963.

According to Kine Weekly the four most popular films at the British box office in 1963 were From Russia With Love, Summer Holiday, Tom Jones and The Great Escape, followed by, in alphabetical order, Doctor in Distress, The Fast Lady, Girls! Girls! Girls!, Heaven's Above, Jason and the Argonauts, In Search of the Castaways, It Happened at the World's Fair, The Longest Day, On the Beat, Sodom and Gomorrah, The V. I. Ps, and The Wrong Arm of the Law.

References

External links

Doctor in Distress at Britmovie

1963 films
1963 comedy films
British comedy films
Doctor in the House
1960s English-language films
Films directed by Ralph Thomas
Films set in hospitals
Films shot at Pinewood Studios
Films produced by Betty Box
Films set in London
1960s British films